Jenő Zichy (5 July 1837, Sárszentmihály - Merano , 26 December 1906, Merano), was a Hungarian nobleman, writer, orientalist and politician.

The Zichy expeditions
Zichy was interested in uncovering the "cradle of Magyardom" and funded a number of expeditions.

He is buried in the Kerepesi Cemetery, Budapest.

References

1837 births
1906 deaths